C. L. Jose, in full Chakkalakal Lonappan Jose, is an Indian playwright of Malayalam literature. One of the pioneers of popular Malayalam theatre and a former chairman of the Kerala Sangeetha Nataka Akademi, Jose is the author of 36 plays, 75 one-act plays, one children's play and Ormakalkku Urakkamilla, his autobiography. He is a recipient of the Kerala Sahitya Akademi Award for Drama, Kerala Sahitya Akademi Award for Overall Contributions, Kerala Sangeetha Nataka Akademi Award, Kerala Sangeetha Nataka Akademi Fellowship and S. L. Puram Sadanandan Puraskaram of the Kerala Sangeetha Nataka Akademi.

Biography 

C. L. Jose was born on at Puthukad, Thrissur district of the south Indian state of Kerala to Chakkalakal Lonappan and Manjali Mariakutty as the eldest of their nine children. His early education was at St. Mary's Lourde's U.P. School - Thrissur after which he started his career at a Chit fund company in Thrissur as a clerk. He started his literary career as a playwright with Manam Thelinju, which he wrote for a local club in the town when he was 24. This followed a body of work which comprises 36 plays, 75 one-act plays and one children's play. Besides he has documented the story of his life in an autobiography, Ormakalkku Urakkamilla. His plays were popular in the amateur theatre Manalkadu, one of his plays, has been translated into 14 Indian languages and was broadcast through the All India Radio as a part of their Drama Week. The work was later adapted into a film Ariyatha Veethikal by K. S. Sethumadhavan. Subsequently, two more of his plays were made into films viz. Bhoomiyile Malakha in 1965 and Agninakshathram in 2004.

Jose has served as a faculty of fine arts at the University of Calicut, has been a member of the Kerala Sahithya Akademi and the Samastha Kerala Sahithya Parishad, has sat in the advisory board of the All India Radio and has presided over the Fine Arts Society of Thrissur. He also chaired the Kerala Sangeetha Nataka Akademi for a brief period in the 1990s and serves as a member of the Pastoral council of the Archdiocese of Thrissur. Three of his plays have been included in the academic curriculum; Manalkkad at the University of Calicut, Jwalanam at the University of Kerala and Yugathrushna at Mahatma Gandhi University.

Jose is married to Lissy and the couple has a daughter and two sons. The family lives in Puthukad, in Thrissur.

Awards and honours 
Jose, who received the Madras Film Fans Association Award for the best film story for the film Agninakshatram in 1977, received the Kerala Sahitya Akademi Award for Drama in 1978 for his play, Jwalanam and the year 2008 brought him two awards viz,. the Kerala Sangeetha Nataka Akademi Award and the Chevalier title of the Holy See. The Kerala Sangeetha Nataka Akademi inducted him as a fellow in 2012, and four years later, he received the 2016 S. L. Puram Sadanandan Puraskaram - the highest award in theatre of the Government of Kerala. The Kerala Sahitya Akademi honoured him again with their annual award for overall contributions in 2017. In 2020, he received the Abu Dhabi Sakthi Award for Overall Contribution (T. K. Ramakrishnan Award).

Bibliography

Plays

Non fiction

Memoirs

Filmography 

 Ariyatha Veethikal
 Bhoomiyile Malakha
 Agninakshathram

See also 

 List of Malayalam-language authors by category
 List of Malayalam-language authors
 2017 Kerala Sahitya Akademi Awards

References

External links 
 
 
 
 
 

Living people
Writers from Kerala
People from Thrissur district
20th-century Indian dramatists and playwrights
Recipients of the Kerala Sahitya Akademi Award
Malayalam-language writers
Date of birth missing (living people)
All India Radio people
1932 births
Recipients of the Abu Dhabi Sakthi Award
Malayalam-language dramatists and playwrights
Dramatists and playwrights from Kerala
Recipients of the Kerala Sangeetha Nataka Akademi Fellowship
Recipients of the Kerala Sangeetha Nataka Akademi Award